Sony Pal (stylised as Sony पल) (Hindi for Moment) is an Indian pay television channel that was launched on 1 September 2014. It was initially aimed at women with women-oriented Hindi-language programming, now focused on family-oriented programming. The channel is owned by Culver Max Entertainment. The channel is available on Dish Network and Sling TV in USA.

History
Sony Pal was launched on 1 September 2014 originally as a pay-TV channel, with Juhi Chawla as its ambassador. The channel mostly aired women-centric reality shows to compete with mainstream Hindi GECs like Star Plus, ZEE TV, Colors whose core TG is also women-oriented.

The channel had a low audience share of 11,000 during the first weeks of its launch, as compared to other channels like Life OK, Star Plus, Zee TV and Colors TV. Due to this, the channel ceased its business operations on 13 February 2015, broadcasting re-runs of Sony TV and Sony SAB shows.

The channel was then rebranded and turned into free-to-air TV channel, as it started syndication of former SET and Sony SAB series like Taarak Mehta Ka Ooltah Chashmah, CID and Baalveer. Sony Pal started gathering a fair audience share by 2016.

Programming

Original  series

References

External links
 
 Sony Liv

Television channels and stations established in 2014
Hindi-language television channels in India
Sony Pictures Entertainment
Sony Pictures Networks India
Television stations in Mumbai
2014 establishments in Maharashtra